The following Union Army units and commanders fought in the Battle of Mill Springs during the American Civil War on January 19, 1862 near present-day Nancy, Kentucky. The Confederate order of battle is listed separately.

Abbreviations used

Military rank
 BG = Brigadier General
 Col = Colonel
 Ltc = Lieutenant Colonel
 Maj = Major
 Cpt = Captain

Other
 w = wounded

First Division, Army of the Ohio

BG George Henry Thomas

Nearby troops not engaged

 10th Kentucky Infantry: Col John Marshall Harlan
 2nd Minnesota Infantry, Company A: Cpt Judson Bishop (on picket duty; engaged in pursuit to Beech Grove)
 17th Ohio Infantry: Col John M. Connell
 35th Ohio Infantry: Col Ferdinand Van Derveer
 38th Ohio Infantry, Company A: Cpt Charles Greenwood (camp guard; engaged in pursuit to Beech Grove)
 1st Michigan Engineers & Mechanics, Companies D, F, G: Ltc K. A. Hunton (camp guard)

References
 Battle, J. H., et al. Kentucky: A History of the State (Louisville, KY: F. A. Battey, 1885).
 The Official Records of the War of the Rebellion, Ser. I, Vol. 7, pp. 79–116; 824.
 Ohio Roster Commission. Official Roster of the Soldiers of the State of Ohio in the War on the Rebellion, 1861–1865, Compiled Under the Direction of the Roster Commission 12 vol. (Akron, OH: Werner Co.), 1886–1895.
 Reid, Whitelaw. Ohio in the War: Her Statesmen, Her Generals, and Soldiers. (Cincinnati, OH: Moore, Wilstach, & Baldwin), 1868.

External links
 Mills Springs Battlefield Association
  Battle of Mill Springs/Fishing Creek by Geoffrey R. Walden

American Civil War orders of battle
Battle of Mill Springs